Larry R. Hicks (born December 13, 1943) is a senior United States district judge of the United States District Court for the District of Nevada.

Education and career

Born in Evanston, Illinois, Hicks received a Bachelor of Science degree from the University of Nevada, Reno in 1965 and a Juris Doctor from the University of Colorado School of Law in 1968.

He was a law clerk, Washoe County District Attorney's Office, Nevada in 1968, and was then an attorney in that office from 1968 to 1974, and District Attorney of Washoe County from 1975 to 1979. He entered private practice in Nevada in 1979, remaining in practice until 2001.

District court service

On September 4, 2001, Hicks was nominated by President George W. Bush to the United States District Court for the District of Nevada vacated by Johnnie B. Rawlinson. Hicks was confirmed by the United States Senate on November 5, 2001, and received his commission on November 7, 2001. He took senior status on December 13, 2012, and was succeeded by Jennifer A. Dorsey.

Cases

In 2011, he was asked by  Shoshone tribes of Northern Nevada to maintain a 2009 restriction that protected the region's environment against Toronto-based Barrick Gold Corp' s wish to expand its gold-extraction operations on their land considered sacred.

In October 2013, he sent Nevada power broker Harvey Whittemore to a 2-year prison sentence for making illegal contributions to Harry Reid's campaign in 2007. In February 2015, he granted a preliminary injunction against the Bureau of Land Management's removal of 200 wild horses in Northern Nevada, and the roundup of 166 others with porcine zona pellucida. In March 2017, he sentenced an Indian man to 15 years in prison for plotting terrorist attacks in his homeland from the US.

In August 2018, he granted a new injunction in favor of Oracle in the case Rimini Street Inc. v. Oracle USA Inc., which led Rimini Street to forward $28.5 million in attorney's fees. In November 2018, he refused the right to strike to garbage collectors employed by Waste Management of Nevada. They were asking for longer, less-supervised lunch breaks.

Family
Larry R. Hicks is the father of Chris Hicks, the 37th District Attorney in Washoe County since January 2015.

References

External links
 
 

1943 births
21st-century American judges
Judges of the United States District Court for the District of Nevada
Living people
People from Evanston, Illinois
United States district court judges appointed by George W. Bush
University of Colorado Law School alumni
University of Nevada alumni